Dorotea Sutara (born 27 March 1996) is a Croatian badminton player. Sutara began playing badminton at age six, joining her older brother at a badminton club in Zagreb. She liked it, so she started to train regularly. In 2007, she began to compete in international tournaments, when she was coached by badminton coach Karol Hawel from Poland. For a number of years her badminton coach was Ivan Puzjak from Croatia with whom she won several junior tournaments in Europe in women's singles and women's doubles as well as the Badminton Europe Junior Circuit in women's doubles 2012/2013. The 2015 European Games will be the biggest tournament Sutara has competed in to date.

Achievements

BWF International Challenge/Series 
Women's singles

Women's doubles

  BWF International Challenge tournament
  BWF International Series tournament
  BWF Future Series tournament

References

External links 
 

1996 births
Living people
Sportspeople from Zagreb
Croatian female badminton players
Badminton players at the 2015 European Games
European Games competitors for Croatia
21st-century Croatian women